Kendel Herrarte (born 6 April 1992) is a Guatemalan international footballer who plays as a midfielder for Liga Nacional club Santa Lucía and the Guatemala national football team.

He was called up to the Guatemala team for the 2015 CONCACAF Gold Cup; he played in Guatemala's opening game.

Honours
Comunicaciones 
Liga Nacional de Guatemala: Clausura 2011, Apertura 2011, Clausura 2013, Apertura 2013, Clausura 2014, Apertura 2014, Clausura 2015

Antigua
Liga Nacional de Guatemala: Apertura 2017

Santa Lucía 
Liga Nacional de Guatemala: Clausura 2021

References

External links
 

1992 births
Living people
Guatemalan footballers
Comunicaciones F.C. players
Antigua GFC players
Guatemala international footballers
2013 Copa Centroamericana players
2014 Copa Centroamericana players
2015 CONCACAF Gold Cup players
Association football midfielders
Guatemala under-20 international footballers
Guatemala youth international footballers
Liga Nacional de Fútbol de Guatemala players